PP-278 Muzaffargarh-VII is a Constituency of Provincial Assembly of Punjab.

General elections 2013

General elections 2008

See also
 PP-277 Muzaffargarh-VI
 PP-279 Muzaffargarh-VIII

References

External links
 Election commission Pakistan's official website
 Awazoday.com check result
 Official Website of Government of Punjab

Provincial constituencies of Punjab, Pakistan
PP-260

Constituencies of Muzaffargarh
Politics of Muzaffargarh
Constituencies of Pakistan